is a tokusatsu television series Kyodai Hero kaiju produced by Toho in 1973. It ran from November 12, 1973, to September 27, 1974. It emerged as a follow-up series to Ike! Godman, but the two share no continuity. Compared to the anthology-like storylines of Ike! Godman, Go! Greenman has a single overarching plot.

Synopsis
Deep beneath Japan, a demonic orange, fang-faced creature with glowing red eyes called Maoh awakes in Hell and plots his escape after being imprisoned there by God. But, in order to do this, he has to obtain the blood of human children and summons his cowardly purple jellyfish-like female servant Tonchiki to assist him. Through her he uses beak-faced, pointy-headed clay doll phantom warriors called Maoh-no Teshita ("Minions of Maoh") that can be transformed into hideous kaiju to complete his task. A set of four special minions, dubbed the 'Kaijin', appeared towards the end of the series, each bearing unique abilities and fighting without the requirement to transform.

However, his plans are quickly foiled after the mighty robot Greenman, a self-described "envoy of God" who can grow to giant size and fire missiles from his chest, descends from space to do battle against Maoh's pawns. After his first battle on Earth, he gives the kids two devices called 'Green Calls' which can be used to summon him whenever the children are in danger.

Returning Monsters
Famously, and in line with the previous Ike! Godman, numerous monsters from Toho's library of Kaiju made appearances in the series.
04. Gaira  from The War of the Gargantuas. 
14. Gabara  from All Monsters Attack.
31. Sanda  from The War of the Gargantuas.
38. King Kong from King Kong Escapes.
Due to copyright reasons the character was simply called "Gorilla". It was the same suit from the film, but looked slightly different due to repairs having been made to it for the show. 
46. An evil version of Minilla, the son of Godzilla.

Other monsters

These are the monsters from the various episodes. The show lasted 52 episodes (each one broken into three parts).

01. Garamedon 
02. Antguirus  
03. Gegil 
05. Bullpull  
06. Tsunozillas  
07. Stock 
08. Valingar
09. Megahertz  
10. Dragonda
11. Totsaurus 
12. Danbaraki 
13. King Takoras 
15. Gyaron  
16. Mohtles
17. Bulguerilla 
18. Alien Dorok
19. Spider 
20. Foxaus 
21. Blanca
22. Ibo Killer 
23. Gowarakadon
24. Jairock
25. Dankett
26. Seguro No. 1  
27. Inbelun 
28. Lorbabla 
29. Giringa 
30. Red Rock 
32. Sibiregon  
33. Zarizon  
34. Flasher (red and blue)   
35. Stegodzillas  
36. Alien Tiborus
37. Yasugon
39. Spider II 
40. Shilarji 
41. Akumon  
42. Kappalge
43. Kupad
44. Hotter 
45. Cross Dressing Kaijin
47. Fonshugaron 
48. Ninja Kaijin
49. Magic Kaijin
50. Tonchiki
51. Pattern Kaijin
52. Maoh the Devil King (a.k.a. "The Devil")

-Note: The henchmen are known as Maoh-no Teshita (Devil's Underlings).

Costumes

Like in Ike! Godman, Gabara's suit was green instead of blue.
Sanda had a new head and wig, and can spray out a mist which makes people sleepy.
Gaira, like Sanda, also had a new head and wig. 
The Gargantuas' suits in this show were in very poor condition. Not only did the suits look like they were rotting (despite a new paint job), but tears could clearly be seen in the legs.
The Minilla suit in this show was brand new (but looks very cheaply built) and was not an actual suit from any of the Godzilla films.
The Flasher kaiju (from episode 34) had previously been seen in the show Assault! Human!!. Since Nippon TV co-produced that show, and co-produced this show with Toho, they were able to use the Flasher costumes. Red Rock, Shibiregon, Zarizon, Spider, Giringa, Gejiru, Stalk, Megahertz, Danbarki, Gyraron and Garmeddeon also appeared on Assault! Human!!.

Theme songs

The various theme songs that appear in this show are:

"Green-Man"

Sung by: ‘Call Unizone’
Lyrics by: Fuji Konosuke
Music by: Yamashita Takeo
Arrangement by: ‘Bob’ Sakuma

-Note: This is the song that plays during the show's opening.

"Green-Man March"

Sung by: Nakatsu Tomoyoshi & Green Peace
Lyrics by: Fuji Konosuke
Music by: Setitguchi Tokichi
Arrangement by: ‘Bob’ Sakuma

"Green-Man No Chosenjou" ("Green-Man’s Challenge")

Sung by: Nakatsu Tomoyoshi & Green Peace
Lyrics by: Fuji Konosuke
Music by: Yamashita Takeo
Arrangement by: ‘Bob’ Sakuma

External links
 http://minicard.hp.infoseek.co.jp/agreenman/agreenman.htm 

1973 Japanese television series debuts
1974 Japanese television series endings
Tokusatsu television series
Toho tokusatsu
Godzilla television series
Fiction about the Devil